Nepal competed at the 1996 Summer Olympics in Atlanta, United States.

Results by event

Athletics
Men's Marathon
 Tika Bogati → 74th place (2:27:04)
Women's Marathon
 Bimala Rana Magar → 62nd place (3:16:19)

References
Official Olympic Reports

Nations at the 1996 Summer Olympics
1996
1996 in Nepalese sport